Mark Davey (born 14 February 1964 in Wakefield) is an English amateur and professional welterweight boxer of the 1970s, and '80s.

Boxing career

Amateur
Mark Davey trained at the White Rose Boys' Club Amateur Boxing Club .

Professional
Mark Davey's first professional boxing bout was a sixth-round points victory over Kevin Howard at Astoria Ballroom, Leeds on Tuesday 6 April 1982, this was followed by fights including; third-round Knockout victory over Andy Thomas (Welsh Area lightweight challenger), eighth-round points victory over, and a fourth-round disqualification defeat by Kevin Pritchard (Central (England) Area lightweight challenger, Central (England) Area super featherweight challenger, British super featherweight champion, British featherweight challenger), Davey's final professional bout was a fifth-round Technical knockout defeat by George Collins (World Boxing Council International welterweight challenger, Commonwealth (British Empire) welterweight challenger, British welterweight challenger) at North Bridge Leisure Centre , Halifax on Thursday 20 February 1986.

Genealogical information
Mark Davey is the son of Terence Davey , and Lucy Davey (née Page) , and the younger brother of Paul A. Davey , and the twin brother of boxer Karl Davey.

References

External links
 

1964 births
English male boxers
Living people
Sportspeople from Wakefield
Welterweight boxers